46th Independent Infantry Brigade is a historical military unit of Bangladesh Army. The Unit is located in Dhaka Cantonment. The Brigade is also known as the Dhaka Brigade.

History
46th Independent Infantry Brigade, under the command of Colonel Shafayet Jamil, supported Major General's Khaled Mosharraf coup on 3 November 1975. Captain Hafiz of the brigade was charged with detaining the Major General Ziaur Rahman. The Government of Bangladesh was criticized for not deploying the brigade to stop the Bangladesh Rifles mutiny in 2009.

References

Brigades of Bangladesh